The 1915 Canton Bulldogs season was their sixth season in the Ohio League. For the first time since 1906, that the team was once again called the "Bulldogs". The year also marked the arrival of the legendary Jim Thorpe to the Canton line-up. The team finished with a known record of 5–2 and a share of the Ohio League title, the Massillon Tigers and the Youngstown Patricians.

Schedule

Game notes

References
Pro Football Archives: Canton Bulldogs 1915

Canton Bulldogs seasons
Canton Bulldogs
Canton Bulldogs